East Bay Chinese School (EBCS), is a non-profit, Chinese heritage school located in Oakland, California. It offers classes in Standard Mandarin and Chinese culture. It began offering classes in 1981.

The school's classes are held at Westlake Middle School. The school has grown from a student body of 26 in 1981 to over 450 students. Classes are held on Saturday mornings for 32 weeks during the school year. In 2007 the school began offering adult Mandarin classes for both beginning and intermediate learners. Its target group for this service is the members of interracial marriage families. In 2009 it offered 29 total Chinese language classes and 15 Chinese culture classes.

In recent years there is a growing number of non-Chinese-heritage students attending the school, possibly due to rising Chinese influence in the global economy. To meet the needs of the school's diverse student body EBCS has implemented several initiatives to ensure the school continue to provide quality education. First, the school put more rigors around academic prerequisites and age requirements for new student enrollment. The intent was to ensure basic standards for all classes so teachers can focus on delivering a quality education. Also, the school requires all teachers to submit their lesson plans for the entire academic year so that progress can be tracked. The school also conducted a school-wide assessment (excluding kindergarten). The purpose of this test was to ensure standards were being met across all levels, and to identify students that need additional help. In 2009, the school adopted new textbooks and multimedia materials designed specifically for Chinese-as-second-language (CSL) learners. 
	
EBCS also is working with the Oakland Unified School District to start Chinese lessons in the classrooms and introducing the Chinese language and culture to the public school students.

External links
Official EBCS School Web Site

Asian-American culture in Oakland, California
Chinese-American culture in California
Education in Oakland, California
Educational institutions established in 1981
Private schools in California
Schools in Alameda County, California
1981 establishments in California